Ukrainian volunteer battalions (more formally , or abbreviated ) were militias and paramilitary groups mobilized as a response to the perceived state of weakness and unwillingness of the regular Armed Forces to counter rising separatism in spring 2014. They trace their origins to the "Maidan Self-Defense" militias formed during the Euromaidan in 2013. The earliest of these volunteer units were later formalized into military, special police and paramilitary formations in a response to the Russian military intervention in Ukraine. Most of the formations were formed or placed under command of the Ministry of Internal Affairs — as "Special Tasks Patrol Police" — and Ministry of Defence — as "Territorial defence battalions". A minority of battalions were independent of state control.

Most of the battalions initially didn't receive money from the government and were self-funded; some were backed by Ukrainian oligarchs while others received donations or started internet crowdfunding campaigns.

As of September 2014, 37 volunteer battalions had taken an active part in the battles of the War in Donbas. Some of the battalion fighters are former Euromaidan activists, but their social background are highly diverse. They included students and military officers. They enjoyed a high level of support in Ukrainian society, ranked second among the most respected institutions in the country. However, their close ties with oligarchs raised fears of the volunteer formations becoming politicized or turning into private armies. Ordered to leave the front lines in 2015, the volunteer battalion phenomenon was largely over within a year of its beginning. Most units continued as fully integrated as units of either the Ukrainian Army or the National Guard of Ukraine.

Volunteer formations

Ministry of Defence 

Since spring 2014, Ministry of Defence had formed 32 volunteer battalions. The ones under the Ministry of Defence command were officially named the "Territorial Defence Battalions". At the end of 2014, territorial defence battalions were reorganized as motorized infantry battalions. The idea of the territorial defence battalions, however, remained and in 2021 the Territorial Defense Forces were later created as a more formal and structured version of the territorial defence battalions.

Besides territorial defence battalions, several regular units of Armed Forces of Ukraine were formed from volunteers, such as 3rd Airmobile Battalion "Phoenix" or 54th Reconnaissance Battalion "UNSO". In 2015 the 46th Spetsnaz Battalion "Donbas Ukraine" was created from volunteers of Donbas Battalion who decided to switch from National Guard of Ukraine to Armed Forces.

Ministry of Internal Affairs 
According to Interior Minister Avakov, by mid-April 2016 205 service personnel of the ministry's volunteer battalions had been killed in action, National Guardsmen included.

Special Tasks Patrol Police

Ministry of Internal Affairs had established 56 special tasks patrol police units sized from company to battalion. After several reorganizations, this number shrunk to 33 units.

Notable Units formed between 2014 and 2015 include:
Dnipro-1 Regiment
Kharkiv Police Battalion
Poltava Battalion
Sich Battalion
Svyatyi Mykolai Battalion

National Guard of Ukraine

The National Guard of Ukraine, subordinated to Ministry of Internal Affairs, had established several reserve battalions, among which were Donbas Battalion and General Kulchytskiy Battalion formed from volunteers and Maidan activists.

Notable Units formed between 2014 and 2015 include:

Azov Battalion
Donbas Battalion

Independent battalions 
The following battalions were not controlled by either the Ministry of Internal Affairs nor the Ministry of Defense, but independently operate.

Ukrainian Volunteer Corps 

Right Sector had formed several battalions that are known as Ukrainian Volunteer Corps. In spring 2015 there were attempts to integrate Ukrainian Volunteer Corps into the Ukrainian Army or National Guard.

Battalion OUN 
Battalion of "Organization of Ukrainian Nationalists" was operating in the area of Pisky, Donetsk. The battalion was disbanded in September 2019; as one of the last units composed purely of volunteer soldiers.

Aerorozvidka 

A unit specialized in aerial reconnaissance and drone warfare. Aerorozvidka was nicknamed a "war startup" by some observers, it began as a group of volunteer drone and IT enthusiasts. It used commercial drones to help the Ukrainian military forces. It was later integrated into the Ukrainian Ground Forces.

Noman Çelebicihan Battalion 

The Noman Çelebicihan Battalion was one of the three reported battalions with majority Muslim membership.
It was composed mostly of ethnic Crimean Tatars and was based in the Kherson region bordering Crimea. It did not participate in any combat operations. The battalion was formed and disbanded in 2016. Many of its members later joined other volunteer battalions or enlisted in the Ukrainian army. The battalion reportedly received assistance from Turkey.

Foreign fighters

The foreign fighter movement in 2014 was largely short-lived, with researcher Kacper Rekawek writing, "fighters arrived throughout the summer of 2014, and most of them were gone from Ukraine at some point in 2015, although some returned later, with a small group settling in Ukraine permanently." By the end of 2015, Rekawek notes, "both sides took steps to professionalise their forces and incorporate the bottom-up organised volunteer battalions into e.g. the Ukrainian National Guard or, in the case of the 'separatists,' into the 'army corps.' This effectively meant an end to foreign fighter recruitment for this conflict and very few (new) foreigners joined either side after the end of 2015."

On 6 October 2014 the Ukrainian parliament voted to allow foreign fighters to join the Ukrainian military. That December, Ukrainian President Petro Poroshenko promised that foreign fighters who join the Ukrainian military will receive citizenship. However, the Kyiv Post reported that by October 2015, only one foreign fighter from Russia had been granted citizenship. The same month, 30 foreign fighters (from Belarus, Georgia, and Russia) rallied in Kyiv for Ukrainian citizenship.

An analysis of foreign fighters by Arkadiusz Legieć, a Senior Analyst at the Polish Institute of International Affairs, estimated that about 17,241 foreign fighters fought in Ukraine between 2014 and 2019. 3,879 of those foreign fighters supported Ukraine and joined foreign volunteer battalions. The largest group of foreign fighters in Ukraine was approximately 3,000 Russian citizen volunteers. The second-largest group consisted of approximately 300 Belarusians. The third-largest group consisted of approximately 120 Georgians. The only other country to exceed 50 foreign fighters was Croatia, with approximately 60 fighters. Other countries whose nationals supported Ukraine included Albania (15), Australia (5), Austria (35), Azerbaijan (20), Belgium (1), Bosnia and Herzegovina (5), Bulgaria (6), Canada (10), Czech Republic (5), Denmark (15), Estonia (10), Finland (15), France (15), Germany (15), Greece (2), Ireland (7), Israel (15), Italy (35), Latvia (8), Lithuania (15), Moldova (15), Kosovo (4), Netherlands (3), North Macedonia (4), Norway (10), Poland (10), Portugal (1), Romania (4), Serbia (6), Slovakia (8), Sweden (25), Turkey (30), the United Kingdom (10), and the United States (15).

Georgian National Legion 

The Georgian National Legion is a paramilitary unit formed of more than 700 soldiers, mostly ethnic Georgian volunteers fighting on the side of Ukraine in the War in Donbas and Russian invasion of Ukraine. The unit was organized in 2014 with the declared aim "to stand up to Russian aggression". The group is commanded by Mamuka Mamulashvili, a veteran Georgian officer. There are also members of Georgian national legion that had experience from the Chechen wars. After the start of Russian invasion of Ukraine more people of different nationalities applied to join Georgian National Legion.The GNL has been seen multiple times in news reports and interviews and can be seen as one of the more known Volunteer battalions.

Dzhokhar Dudayev battalion 
 

The Dzhokhar Dudayev Battalion, originally named the "Chechen battalion", was set up in March 2014 and is one of several Chechen volunteer armed formations fighting on the side of Ukraine. It was later named after Chechnya's first president and leader Dzhokhar Dudayev. The battalion has been under the command of Adam Osmayev after Isa Munayev was killed in action during the Battle of Debaltseve. The battalion is made up mostly of Chechen volunteers, many of whom fought in the First and Second Chechen War. Members of the battalion view the war as part of a broader struggle against Russian imperialism and the Kadyrov regime.  The battalion specializes in counter-subversion. Since the start of the 2022 Russian invasion of Ukraine, the battalion has participated in the defence of Kyiv and has taken part in numerous battles and offensives such as the Kharkiv offensive. Since November 2022, the battalion is involved in the Battle of Bakhmut.

Sheikh Mansur Battalion

The Sheikh Mansur Battalion is one of several Chechen volunteer armed formations  fighting on the side of Ukraine. It is named after an 18th-century Chechen leader who fought against the Russian expansion into the Caucasus. Following its establishment in 2014, it has been involved in the Donbas war. It was reported to be defending the front line near Mariupol in 2015. Despite its staunch pro-Ukrainian stance, the battalion suffered sanctions from the Ukrainian government (with some members being extradited to Russia), and as a result, the battalion was disbanded in September 2019; as one of the last units composed purely of volunteer soldiers. However, during the 2022 Russian invasion of Ukraine, the battalion was reported to be active again. Since then, the battalion has been fighting in numerous major battles such as the Battle of Kyiv, Battle of Mariupol and Battle of Sievierodonetsk. The battalion has been involved in intense battles in the Battle of Bakhmut and Battle of Soledar since November 2022.

Separate Special-Purpose Battalion

The Separate Special-Purpose Battalion (OBON) of the Ministry of Defense of the Chechen Republic of Ichkeria is one of several Chechen volunteer armed formations  fighting on the side of the Armed Forces of Ukraine. It is functioning as part of the Foreign Legion of Territorial Defense of Ukraine. It was created by Akhmed Zakayev on July 31, 2022, on the basis of a Chechen formation that has been fighting on the side of the Armed Forces of Ukraine since Russia's full-scale invasion of Ukraine.

Similar later formations

Tactical Group "Belarus" 

Tactical Group "Belarus" is a volunteer group of Belarusian nationals who were part of the Ukrainian volunteer battalions.

Territorial Defense Forces 

In 2022, the former Territorial defence battalions were reorganized into a more formal and structured independent branch of the armed forces known as the Territorial Defense Forces. They serve as a spiritual successor of the volunteer battalions, allowing local civilian volunteers to join and do local territorial defense against an invasion.

International Legion of Territorial Defense of Ukraine 

Following the 2022 invasion of Ukraine by forces of the Russian Federation, Ukrainian president Volodymyr Zelenskyy urged foreign volunteers to travel to Ukrainian embassies across the world to join a new 'International Brigade' of the Ukrainian armed forces.

Freedom of Russia Legion 

Freedom of Russia Legion was formed following the 2022 invasion, which made up of defectors of the Russian armed forces. The legion also reportedly consists of volunteers from the Russian opposition.

References

Sources
 Rosaria Puglisi, Heroes or Villains? Volunteer Battalions in Post-Maidan Ukraine // Istituto Affari Internazionali, March 2015
 Margaret Klein, Briefing No. 27 .pdf Ukraine’s volunteer battalions – advantages and challenge // Swedish Defence Research Agency, April 2015
 Ilmari Käihkö, A nation-in-the-making, in arms: control of force, strategy and the Ukrainian Volunteer Battalions, Defence Studies, Volume 18 Issue 2, 2018, pp. 147–166.
 Ilmari Käihkö, The War Between People in Ukraine, The War on the Rocks, 21 March 2018

Paramilitary forces of Ukraine
War in Donbas
 
Battalions of Ukraine